The Swan is a Grade II listed pub in Little Totham, Essex, England.

It was CAMRA's National Pub of the Year for 2002 and 2005.

References

Grade II listed pubs in Essex
Maldon District
Pubs in Essex